Idarkopf Tower, also known as Idarkopf Observation Tower for long, is a wooden German lattice observation tower on the summit of Mt. Idarkopf in the state of Rhineland-Palatinate. Built in 1980, the tower was constructed according to a certain kind of specialized wooden frame and was designed through triangular sketch. Staircases are uncountable because of the vast number of steps. The roof, which contains the observation deck, is considered the highest accessible point in the whole area, providing a unique view of the town nearby.

The hybrid construction made of wood and steel was erected in 2022 in place of the older wooden tower that was severely damaged by fire in October 2018 and demolished in February 2022. The opening of the new tower took place in December 2022.

History

The Idarkopf Tower's construction was both commenced and finished in 1980, specifically built for observation on top of the Idarkopf mountain. Sources prove that the Idarkopf Tower replaced an older tower, used during both first and second world wars as an observation tower and as a watchtower for the German artillery.

Geography

The Idarkopf Tower stands on the summit of the  mountain of Idarkopf, a tall mountain included in the low mountain range of the Hunsrück in Idar Forest, which in turn lies in the municipalities of Morbach, Rhaunen, Idar-Oberstein and Kempfeld, which are all in the districts (kreis) of Bernkastel-Wittlich, Birkenfeld, and Trier-Saarburg, all located in the state of Rhineland-Palatinate, in Germany.

Standing on several municipalities, the Idarkopf is surrounded by numerous hotels, residential apartments, parks, outdoor sports facilities, and other famous landmarks.

Hunsrück

The Hunsrück is a low mountain range in Rhineland-Palatinate, Germany. It is bounded by the river valleys of the Moselle (north), the Nahe (south), and the Rhine (east). The Hunsrück is continued by the Taunus mountains on the eastern side of the Rhine. In the north behind the Moselle, it is continued by the Eifel. To the south of the Nahe, the Palatinate is to be found.

There are several chains of higher peaks within the Hunsrück, all bearing names on their own: the (Black Forest) Hochwald, the Idar Forest, the Soonwald, and the Bingen Forest. The highest peak is the Erbeskopf (816 m).

Idar Forest

The Idar Forest (German: Idarwald, Celtic: "id ar" - hill forest above the land) is a major German forest, part of the Hunsrück low mountain range in the German federal state of Rhineland-Palatinate, Germany.

Towns

Simmern
Kirchberg
Bernkastel-Kues
Kastellaun
Idar-Oberstein

Municipalities

Morbach
Rhaunen
Kempfeld
Stipshausen

Districts

Bernkastel-Wittlich
Birkenfeld
Trier-Saarburg

See also

Lattice tower
Observation tower
Idar Forest
Atzelberg Tower

References

External links
(German): Official Website of the Idarkopf
On Idarkopf Mountain :: Nature Preserve: Maasberg
Idarkopf mountain | Hotels near Idarkopf mountain (Bernkastel-Kues) :: HotelsAccommodation.com.au
Hunsrück Vacations — Outdoors, Outlaws, Out Of This World :: MyGermanCity.com
Stipshausen map - Birkenfeld, Rheinland-Pfalz, Germany :: Ugo.cn

Observation towers in Rhineland-Palatinate
Towers completed in 2022